Ghattas, sometimes rendered as Gattas or Gattaz, is a name usually borne by Arab Christians from the Middle East. It is derived from the Arabic verb meaning "to submerge in water (or another liquid)", most often encountered as a name among Egyptian Copts and Lebanese Christians with the meaning of "baptism".

It may refer to:

First name
 Ghattas Hazim (born 1963), Eastern Orthodox Metropolitan of Baghdad, Kuwait and Dependencies, since 2014

Surname 
 Basel Ghattas , Lebanese Business Man politician
 Dan Christian Ghattas, intersex activist and university lecturer
 Ignatius Ghattas (1920–1992), bishop of the Melkite Greek Catholic Church. Served as Eparch of Newton
 Kim Ghattas (born 1977), journalist
 Maged George Elias Ghattas, Egyptian politician, minister
 Marie-Alphonsine Danil Ghattas (1843—1927), Palestinian Christian nun who was canonized
 Rodrigo Gattas (born 1991), Palestinian Chilean football player
 Stéphanos II Ghattas (1920–2009), cleric of the Coptic Catholic Church. Patriarch of Alexandria from 1986 to 2006

See also
Gatta
Gattaz

References

Arabic-language surnames